Constituency NA-129 (Lahore-XII) was a constituency for the National Assembly of Pakistan. After the 2018 delimitations, its areas were divided among NA-132 (Lahore-X) and NA-134 (Lahore-XII).
General Election 2018 President of Pmln and ex chief minister of Punjab Shahbaz Sharif again file the nomination papers from this Constituency because of Sandhu Family and People of Lakhoki Village . Ch Mansha Sandhu and Lakhoki People have strong hold in the Constituency . Only for this reason Pmln President cannot put any candidate against Mansha Sandhu and contest at this seat by himself other people of Sandhu family who is the famous in the Constituency below here

Ch Naqash Saleem Sandhu 
Ch Nadeem Abbas Sandhu 
Ch Awais Sandhu 
Ch Bashir Sandhu 
Ch Waris Sandhu 
Ch Ashraf Sandhu 
Ch Aslam Sandhu 
Ch Khushi Muhammad
Ch Ashraf Sandhu 
Ch Zubair Waris Sandhu 
Ch Nouman Sandhu 
Ch Azam Sandhu 
Ch Shahbaz Sandhu Adv 
Ch Akaash Sandhu

Election 2002 

General elections were held on 10 Oct 2002. Major(R) Habibullah Warriach of PML-Q won by 39,420 votes.

Election 2008 

General elections were held on 18 Feb 2008. Tariq Shabbir of PPP won by 36,604 votes.

Election 2013 

General elections were held on 11 May 2013. Shazia Mubashar of PML-N won the election against PTI candidates Chauhdary Mansha

References

External links 
 Election result's official website

NA-129
Abolished National Assembly Constituencies of Pakistan